West Maitland was an electoral district for the Legislative Assembly in the Australian State of New South Wales from 1859 to 1904, including the town of Maitland. It was abolished in 1904 due to the re-distribution of electorates following the 1903 New South Wales referendum, which required the number of members of the Legislative Assembly to be reduced from 125 to 90. It was largely replaced by the new district of Maitland and the balance absorbed by Northumberland.

Members for West Maitland

Election results

References

Former electoral districts of New South Wales
Constituencies established in 1859
1859 establishments in Australia
Constituencies disestablished in 1904
1904 disestablishments in Australia